Imagerical is the debut album by Canadian singer and songwriter Matt Brouwer. It was released on Reunion Records on May 29, 2001 and received universal acclaim from the gospel music industry. Christianity Today hailed Brouwer as one of the Best New Artists of 2001 along with Katy Perry (known then as Katy Hudson). The album produced 2 top 10 Christian hits on CHR radio and sold well in the US and Canada. In 2002 the album was nominated for a Canadian JUNO Award for Best Gospel Album.

Track listing

References

External links
 Imagerical at Christianity Today

2001 debut albums
Matt Brouwer albums
Reunion Records albums